Jean Franklin Banyolag (born June 30, 1988 in Yaoundé) is a Cameroon football player who plays for Yangon United FC.

References

Ivorian footballers
1988 births
Living people
Kadji Sports Academy players
Bangnolac Jean Franklin
Bangnolac Jean Franklin
Expatriate footballers in Thailand
Expatriate footballers in Myanmar
Cameroonian expatriate sportspeople in Thailand
Footballers from Yaoundé
Association football midfielders